John Edward Crookes (7 March 1890 – 8 September 1948) was an English cricketer. Crookes was a right-handed batsman.

Crookes made his county cricket debut for Lincolnshirein the 1909 Minor Counties Championship against Suffolk. Crookes would represent Lincolnshire in 10 Minor Counties matches. His final Minor Counties match came in 1910  against Suffolk.

Ten years later Crookes represented Hampshire in three first-class match in 1920 County Championship. Crookes made his debut  against Warwickshire. Crookes played two further matches for the club, against Worcestershire and Somerset. The 1920 season was the only season in which Crookes represented the club.

Crookes died in Cuddington, Surrey on 8 September 1948.

External links
John Crookes at Cricinfo
John Crookes at CricketArchive

1890 births
1948 deaths
People from Horncastle, Lincolnshire
English cricketers
Lincolnshire cricketers
Hampshire cricketers